Vasily Denisovich Generalov 8 March 1867, Potyomkinskaya, Don Host Oblast - 8 May 1887) was a Russian revolutionary and a member of Narodnaya Volya.

In 1886, Generalov enrolled in St. Petersburg University and later became a member of the "Terrorist Faction" of Narodnaya Volya. He took active part in preparing the assassination of Alexander III. On March 1, 1887, Generalov was arrested at Nevsky Prospekt, where he was supposed to murder the tsar.

Generalov was tried and sentenced to death by hanging by the Special Presence of the Ruling Senate. He was executed in the Shlisselburg Fortress.

References

1867 births
1887 deaths
People from Kotelnikovsky District
People from Don Host Oblast
Russian revolutionaries
Narodnaya Volya
Executed revolutionaries
People executed by the Russian Empire by hanging
Executed Russian people
19th-century executions by the Russian Empire
19th-century people from the Russian Empire